Melanohalea zopheroa is a species of lichen in the family Parmeliaceae. It was first formally described in 1977 by Ted Esslinger as Parmelia zopheroa. A year later, he transferred it to the new genus Melanelia, which he created to contain the brown Parmeliae species. In 2004, after early molecular phylogenetic evidence showed that Melanelia was not monophyletic, Melanohalea was circumscribed by lichenologists Oscar Blanco, Ana Crespo, Pradeep K. Divakar, Esslinger, David L. Hawksworth and H. Thorsten Lumbsch, and M. zopheroa was transferred to it. The lichen has a disjunct distribution, as it is found in South America (Chile) and in New Zealand.

David Galloway and Per Magnus Jørgensen have suggested that Melanohalea zopheroa is a sorediate counterpart of the New Zealand species Melanelia inactiva.

References

zopheroa
Lichen species
Lichens described in 1977
Lichens of New Zealand
Lichens of Chile
Taxa named by Helge Thorsten Lumbsch
Taxa named by David Leslie Hawksworth